Will Snowdon (born 7 January 1983) is an English former professional footballer.

Snowdon played in the Scottish leagues for Livingston, Partick Thistle and Stranraer. Snowdon was an unused substitute for Livingston as they won the 2004 Scottish League Cup Final.

Since 2007, Snowdon played for Bo'ness United up until his retirement from playing in April 2021.

Honours
Titles
Scottish League Cup: 2004
Individual
Ipswich Town Young Player of the Year: 2001–02

References

External links 
 

1983 births
Living people
Sportspeople from Colchester
English footballers
Livingston F.C. players
Partick Thistle F.C. players
Stranraer F.C. players
Bo'ness United F.C. players
Scottish Premier League players
Scottish Football League players
Association football defenders